Joseph Williams (March 29, 1779 – November 28, 1865) was an American politician.

Williams, the son of Gen. Joseph Williams, was born at Norwich, Connecticut, March 29, 1779.

He graduated from Yale College in 1798.  Alter studying at Litchfield Law School, he commenced the practice
of law in his native place, with the public interests of which he was, during his long life, honorably identified. He held various positions of trust, and was one of the projectors, and, at the time of his death, the President of the Norwich Savings Society. He also served several terms in the Connecticut State Legislature.

He died in Norwich, Nov. 28, 1865, aged 86 years. He was the oldest native male resident of Norwich, and the
last surviving member of the Yale Class of 1798.  Two daughters, unmarried, survive him.

External links

1779 births
1865 deaths
Yale College alumni
Litchfield Law School alumni
Politicians from Norwalk, Connecticut
Members of the Connecticut General Assembly
Connecticut lawyers
19th-century American lawyers